James Gordon White was a screenwriter best known for his work in the exploitation field.

Select Credits
The Glory Stompers (1967)
The Hellcats (1968)
The Mini-Skirt Mob (1968)
The Young Animals (1968)
The Devil's 8 (1969)
Hell's Belles (1969)
Scream Free! (1969)
Bigfoot (1970)
The Incredible 2-Headed Transplant (1971)
The Tormentors (1971)
The Thing with Two Heads (1972)
Ten Violent Women (1982)

References

External links

American screenwriters